Rhodopsalta cruentata, also known as the blood redtail cicada, is a species of insect that is endemic to New Zealand. This species was first described in 1775 by Johann Christian Fabricius and named Tettigonia cruentata.

References

Cicadas of New Zealand
Insects described in 1775
Endemic fauna of New Zealand
Taxa named by Johan Christian Fabricius
Cicadettini
Endemic insects of New Zealand